Pease Creek is a stream in the U.S. state of South Dakota.

Pease Creek has the name of F. D. Pease, an early settler and afterward territorial politician.

See also
List of rivers of South Dakota

References

Rivers of Charles Mix County, South Dakota
Rivers of South Dakota